Sefer ha-Asuppot (Hebrew: ספר האסופות; lit. "Book of the collections") is the name of a compilation of medieval German Jewish Halakha and Minhagim, the manuscript of which is privately held by David H. Feinberg of New York (fragments from the text are also found in MSS Paris 1408 and Girona 11.17). The work includes a large number of teachings, minhagim, descriptions of popular costumes, halachic rulings, and collected stories from numerous authors, displaying the ordinary life of Rhineland Jews in during the twelfth and thirteenth centuries. The manuscript is endowed with vowel-signs almost throughout, which makes it the only non-liturgical and non-Biblical text of its kind, and the vowels follow the Spanish pronunciation. The manuscript is the work of several scribes, containing multiple hands and multiple inks. One scribe was probably named Meir.

Authorship is now generally attributed to Elijah b. Isaac Lattes of Carcassonne, but many scholars dissent. The main author was Ashkenazi and a student of Eleazar of Worms (d. 1238), but some content is from a later period, including a model writ of divorce dated 1307. Aptowitzer attributed at least part of the text to a grandson of Eliezer b. Joel HaLevi, suggesting Eliezer's great-grandson Abraham b. Eliezer haLevi, a student of Meir of Rothenburg (d. 1293), but Dziubas disagrees.

Samuel David Luzzatto published some excerpts from the book in 1846. Eliakim Carmoly publicly appealed for the manuscript's publication in 1867. Jacob Glassberg published some excerpts on circumcision in 1892. Moses Gaster published some excerpts on Passover in his Montefiore Report 1893. Aptowitzer included sections which he attributed to Eliezer b. Joel HaLevi's grandson in Mavo l'Sefer RAbYH (1938). Abraham Isaac Dziubas published a two-volume edition of the Asuppot's section on forbidden foods in 1942. Simha Assaf republished the excerpt on education in 1948.

Contents 
The contest of the work mostly deal with the laws relating to divorce, Rosh Hashanah, tefillin, the ritual slaughtering of animals, the observance of Shabbat and the observance of Passover, with a description of the ritual of the Seder. The work also discuses medical prescriptions, charms, marriage ceremonies, numerous commercial and religious contracts, various forms of excommunication, and mourning and burial customs. Lastly, at the end of the work is a summary of all material discussed. The vocalization of the work has been studied by scholars, who have concluded that medieval German Ashkenazi vocalization was much akin to contemporary Sephardic vocalization.

Character 
The author of Asuppot compiles several rich literary resources, which displays more interest in every branch of religious life than the majority of similar compilers. Particularly, the author often mentions local customs and even superstitions. Additionally, the accuracy with which he indicates the sources of his information is far beyond his contemporaries. From a philological point of view, the book possesses considerable interest, from the fact that numerous German glosses are found in the text that explain difficult or obscure terms, and some that show, incidentally, the intimate knowledge of German possessed by the Jews of that time.

References 

14th-century books
Hebrew-language books
Rabbinic legal texts and responsa
Sifrei Kodesh